Measuring the World is a novel by Austrian author Daniel Kehlmann, published in 2005 by Rowohlt Verlag, Reinbek. The novel re-imagines the lives of German mathematician Carl Friedrich Gauss and German geographer Alexander von Humboldt—who was accompanied on his journeys by French explorer Aimé Bonpland—and their many groundbreaking ways of taking the world's measure, as well as Humboldt's and Bonpland's travels in America and their meeting in 1828. One subplot fictionalises the conflict between Gauss and his son Eugene; while Eugene wanted to become a linguist, his father decreed that he study law. The book was a bestseller; by 2012 it had sold more than 2.3 million copies in Germany alone.

A film version directed by Detlev Buck was released in 2012.

Translations

The English translation is by Carol Brown Janeway (November 2006).

Rosa Pilar Blanco translated the book into Spanish.

References

External links
 Reviews:Measuring the World from Goodreads.

2005 German novels
Novels about mathematics
Novels by Daniel Kehlmann
Biographical novels
Pantheon Books books
Novels set in the 1820s
German novels adapted into films